La muchachada de a bordo (English language:Boys on Board) is a 1936  Argentine comedy film directed and written by Manuel Romero. The film starred Luis Sandrini and Tito Lusiardo. The film was edited by Francisco Múgica.

Cast
Luis Sandrini
Tito Lusiardo
Santiago Arrieta
José Gola
Benita Puértolas
Alicia Barrié
Juan Mangiante

External links

1936 films
1930s Spanish-language films
Argentine black-and-white films
1936 comedy films
Films directed by Manuel Romero
Argentine comedy films
1930s Argentine films